= Brian Connell (author) =

South African author

- Born: Kenya
- Died: Durban, South Africa
- Citizenship: South African
- Occupation: Author
- Writing career
- Genre: Nature
- Subjects: Conservation
- Website: nici.co.za

Brian Connell is a South African ethologist, photographer, conservationist, and author of a number of books.

== Books ==
- Connell, Brian (2013). Msomi and Me: Tales from the African Bush (2nd ed.). Durban, South Africa: Just Done Productions Publishing. ISBN 978-1-920702-06-9. Archived from the original on 6 October 2014.
